Karl Ludwig, 3rd Prince of Hohenlohe-Langenburg (10 September 1762 in Langenburg – 4 April 1825 in Langenburg) was the third Prince of Hohenlohe-Langenburg. He was the first child of Prince Christian Albert of Hohenlohe-Langenburg and his wife, Princess Caroline of Stolberg-Gedern.

He was an avid musician. From 1815 to 1825, he held a seat in the Estates Assembly and since 1820 the First Chamber of the reorganized Estates, but after 1819, he let himself be represented by his son Ernst.

Marriage and issue 
On 30 January 1789 at Kliczków Castle, he married Countess Amalie Henriette of Solms-Baruth (1768–1847), daughter of Count John Christian II of Solms-Baruth. The marriage produced the following thirteen children: 
 Princess Louise of Hohenlohe-Langenburg (1789)
 Princess Elisabeth of Hohenlohe-Langenburg (1790-1830); married Victor Amadeus, Landgrave of Hesse-Rotenburg, Duke of Ratibór
 Princess Constance of Hohenlohe-Langenburg (1792-1847); married Franz Joseph, Prince of Hohenlohe-Schillingsfürst
 Princess Emilie of Hohenlohe-Langenburg (1793-1859); married Count Friedrich Ludwig of Castell-Castell; their daughter married Julius, Count of Lippe-Biesterfeld and had issue
 Prince Ernst of Hohenlohe-Langenburg (1794–1860); married in 1828 Princess Feodora of Leiningen (1807-1872)
 Prince Frederick of Hohenlohe-Langenburg (1797)
 Princess Marie Henriette of Hohenlohe-Langenburg (1798)
 Princess Louise of Hohenlohe-Langenburg (1799-1881); married Prince Adolf of Hohenlohe-Ingelfingen
 Princess Johanna of Hohenlohe-Langenburg (1800-1877); married Count Emil Christian of Erbach-Schönberg
 Princess Agnes of Hohenlohe-Langenburg (1804-1835); married Konstantin, Hereditary Prince of Löwenstein-Wertheim-Rosenberg
 Prince Henry Gustav of Hohenlohe-Langenburg (1806-1861)
 Princess Helene of Hohenlohe-Langenburg (1807-1880); married Duke Eugen of Württemberg
 Prince Henry of Hohenlohe-Langenburg

References 
 Franz Josef Fürst zu Hohenlohe-Schillingsfürst: Monarchen – Edelleute – Bürger. Die Nachkommen des Fürsten Carl Ludwig zu Hohenlohe-Langenburg 1762–1825, 2nd edition, Degener & Co., Neustadt a. d. Aisch, 1963 (Bibliothek familiengeschichtlicher Arbeiten, vol. 13)

External links 
 Genealogy of the Hohenlohe family

House of Hohenlohe
Princes of Hohenlohe-Langenburg
People from Langenburg
1762 births
1825 deaths